The Grand Chasms are two or more deep crevasses in the Filchner Ice Shelf, Antarctica, extending west for an unknown distance from 37°W, close west of the Touchdown Hills. It was discovered by the Commonwealth Trans-Antarctic Expedition, 1955–58. During 1957 it was examined by a U.S. party from Ellsworth Station led by Edward Thiel, who applied the descriptive name.

References

Crevasse fields of Antarctica
Filchner-Ronne Ice Shelf
Bodies of ice of Queen Elizabeth Land